Senator Lindsey may refer to:

Coleman Lindsey, Louisiana State Senate
Pat Lindsey (1936–2009), Alabama State Senate
Stephen Lindsey (1828–1884), Maine State Senate
Uvalde Lindsey (born 1940), Arkansas State Senate

See also
Senator Lindsay (disambiguation)
Senator Lindsley (disambiguation)